Rancho Soquel was a   Mexican land grant in present-day Santa Cruz County, California given in 1833 by Governor José Figueroa to María Martina Castro y Amador.   In 1844, Martina Castro was granted by Governor José Figueroa a further  grant known as the Soquel Augmentation.  The Rancho Soquel grant along Monterey Bay includes present-day Soquel and Capitola. Rancho Aptos of her brother Rafael Castro formed the south boundary of the grant. The much-larger Soquel Augmentation grant lay inland from both of these, and comprised mainly mountain watershed land.

History

María Martina Castro y Amador (1807–1890), was born in Villa de Branciforte, daughter of José Joaquín Castro (1768–1838), grantee of Rancho San Andrés.  Martina married Simon Cota, a soldier stationed at Monterey, in 1824.  When Simon died six years later, in 1830, Martina became a widow with four children.  Martina married Irishman Michael Lodge (1797–1849) in 1831, and she was granted the half square league Rancho Soquel in 1833.  

With Lodge's encouragement, Martina applied for a much larger  grant of forested mountain land, inland from the earlier Soquel and Aptos grants. The huge area included the eastern side of the Soquel Creek watershed, most of the Aptos Creek watershed, Trout Gulch and much of Valencia Creek. The grant was approved in 1844 by governor Manuel Micheltorena. Lodge recognized the value of timber resources on the new lands, and contracted John Hames and John Daubenbiss to build a sawmill. Parts of the grant are now The Forest of Nisene Marks State Park, and the Soquel Demonstration State Forest. 
 
In 1848, Michael Lodge and Martina joined the California Gold Rush. Martina returned after three of her children died, but Lodge never returned and was presumed murdered. In 1849, Martina, at 42, married Louis Depeaux, a man 16 years younger than she was. Soon afterward, Depeaux left. A daughter, Carmelita (Carmel) Castro Lodge (1827–1923) married Thomas Fallon in 1849.

With the cession of California to the United States following the Mexican-American War, the 1848 Treaty of Guadalupe Hidalgo provided that the land grants would be honored.  As required by the Land Act of 1851, a claim was filed for the Soquel grant with the Public Land Commission in 1852, and the grant was patented to Martina Castro in 1860. A claim for the Soquel Augmentation grant was filed with the Land Commission in 1853, and the grant was patented to Martina Castro in 1860.

In Depeaux's absence, Martina gave each of her remaining eight children an undivided one-ninth of the Rancho Soquel grant.  In 1856, with the onset of mental instability, Martina  sold her remaining land and spent her last years with her daughter Guadalupe in Capitola until her death in 1890. Much of the rancho land was sold to Frederick A. Hihn in the 1860s, including much of the redwood forest area and the beach-side area that became Capitola.

References

External links
The Martina Castro Lodge Family. Oral history with Martina's granddaughter, Carrie Lodge, conducted in 1965
 

California ranchos
Ranchos of Santa Cruz County, California
1833 establishments in Alta California